The Barbican Centre is a performing arts centre in the Barbican Estate of the City of London and the largest of its kind in Europe. The centre hosts classical and contemporary music concerts, theatre performances, film screenings and art exhibitions. It also houses a library, three restaurants, and a conservatory. The Barbican Centre is a member of the Global Cultural Districts Network.

The London Symphony Orchestra and the BBC Symphony Orchestra are based in the centre's Concert Hall. In 2013, it once again became the London-based venue of the Royal Shakespeare Company following the company's departure in 2001.

The Barbican Centre is owned, funded, and managed by the City of London Corporation. It was built as the City's gift to the nation at a cost of £161 million (equivalent to £480 million in 2014) and was officially opened to the public by Queen Elizabeth II on 3 March 1982.  The Barbican Centre is also known for its brutalist architecture.

Performance halls and facilities
 Barbican Hall: capacity 1,943; home of the London Symphony Orchestra and the BBC Symphony Orchestra.
 Barbican Theatre: capacity 1,156; designed exclusively by and for the Royal Shakespeare Company
 The Pit: flexible 200-seat theatre venue
 Barbican Art Gallery and the free new-commission gallery The Curve
 Barbican Film: 3 cinema screens with seating capacity of 288, 156 and 156
 Barbican Library: Public lending library with special collections in arts and music
 Restaurants: 3
 Conference halls: 7
 Trade exhibition halls: 2
 Informal performance spaces

The second-floor library is one of the five City of London libraries. It is one of the largest public libraries in London and has a separate arts library, a large music library and a children's library which regularly conducts free events. The Barbican Library houses the 'London Collection' of historical books and resources, some of which date back 300 years, all being available on loan. The library presents regular literary events and has an art exhibition space for hire. The music library has two free practice pianos for public use.

History and design

The Barbican Centre had a long development period, only opening some years after the surrounding Barbican Estate housing complex had been finished.  It is situated in an area which was badly bombed during World War II.

The Barbican Centre, designed by Peter Chamberlin, Geoffry Powell and Christoph Bon of Chamberlin, Powell and Bon in the Brutalist style, has a complex multi-level layout with numerous entrances. Lines painted on the ground help would-be audience members avoid getting lost on the walkways of the Barbican Estate, within which the centre is located, on the way to it. The Barbican Centre's design – a concrete ziggurat – has always been controversial and divides opinion. It was voted "London's ugliest building" in a Grey London poll in September 2003.

In September 2001, arts minister Tessa Blackstone announced that the Barbican Centre complex was to be a Grade II listed building. It has been designated a site of special architectural interest for its scale, its cohesion and the ambition of the project. The centre was designed by architectural practice Chamberlin, Powell and Bon, who were also responsible for the upscale residential area surrounding the centre (the Barbican Estate), as well as the nearby Golden Lane Estate. Project architect John Honer later worked on the British Library at St Pancras – a red brick ziggurat.

In the mid-1990s, a cosmetic improvement scheme by Theo Crosby, of the Pentagram design studio, added statues and decorative features reminiscent of the Arts and Crafts movement. In 2005–2006, the centre underwent a more significant refurbishment, designed by architects Allford Hall Monaghan Morris and Roger Westman, which improved circulation and introduced bold signage in a style in keeping with the centre's original 1970s Brutalist architecture. That improvement scheme added an internal bridge linking the Silk Street foyer area with the lakeside foyer area. The centre's Silk Street entrance, previously dominated by an access for vehicles, was modified to give better pedestrian access. The scheme included removing most of the mid-1990s embellishments.

Outside, the main focal point of the centre is the lake and its neighbouring terrace. The theatre's fly tower has been surrounded by glass and made into a high-level conservatory.  The Barbican Hall's acoustic has also been controversial: some praised it as attractively warm, but others found it too dry for large-scale orchestral performance.

In 1994, Chicago acoustician Larry Kirkegaard oversaw a £500,000 acoustic re-engineering of the hall "producing a perceptible improvement in echo control and sound absorption", music critic Norman Lebrecht wrote in October 2000 – and returned in 2001 to rip out the stage canopy and drop adjustable acoustic reflectors, designed by Caruso St John, from the ceiling, as part of a £7.5 mn refurbishment of the hall. Art music magazine Gramophone still complained about "the relative dryness of the Barbican acoustic" in August 2007.

The theatre was built as the London home of the Royal Shakespeare Company, which was involved in the design, but decided not to renew its contract in 2002 after claiming a lack of performing space, plus the artistic director, Adrian Noble, wanting to develop the company's touring performances. The theatre's response was to extend its existing six-month season of international productions, "Barbican International Theatre Event", to the whole year. On 23 January 2013 Greg Doran, RSC artistic director, announced the company's return to the Barbican Centre in a three-year season of Shakespeare's history plays.

The Guildhall School of Music and Drama, where the Barbican Centre theatrical performances are occasionally staged, and the City of London's Barbican Library, neither part of the centre, are also on the site. The Museum of London is nearby at Aldersgate, and is also within the Barbican Estate.

In popular culture

In literature
The Barbican Centre features in Michael Paraskos's novel In Search of Sixpence as the home of the lead character, Geroud, and also a bar called "The Gin Bar" loosely based on the Gin Joint bar at the Barbican Centre.

TV and film
The centre has been used as a filming location for numerous TV shows and films, including the BBC series Luther and in the Disney+ series Andor.

Gallery

Nearby railway stations
 Barbican tube station
 Farringdon station
 Liverpool Street railway station
 Moorgate tube station
 St Paul's tube station

See also
 Barbican Centre, York
 Barbicania, a feature-length film by Ila Bêka & Louise Lemoine
 Culture of London
 List of concert halls

References

External links

 

Barbican Estate
1982 establishments in England
Art museums and galleries in London
Arts centres in London
Music venues completed in 1982
Concert halls in London
Dance in London
Event venues established in 1982
Grade II listed buildings in the City of London
London Symphony Orchestra
Museums in the City of London
Theatres in the City of London
Brutalist architecture in London